Pireh Sorkh, also known as Pir Sorkh or Pir-i-Surkh, may refer to:
 Pireh Sorkh-e Bala
 Pireh Sorkh-e Pain